Da Good Da Bad & Da Ugly is the sixth studio album by the Houston hip hop group the Geto Boys, released in late 1998 on Rap-A-Lot/Virgin Records.

Following the short-lived reunion of the group's three core members, Scarface, Willie D and Bushwick Bill, for 1996's acclaimed The Resurrection album, Bushwick left to pursue a solo career, leaving Scarface and Willie D to continue on as a duo. Unlike past Geto Boys albums, this one has a guest rapper on nearly every track. Most guest appearances were provided by the group's Rap-A-Lot record mates, including DMG, Yukmouth, Tela, Devin the Dude, Outlawz and Ghetto Twiinz.

Following the release of Da Good Da Bad & Da Ugly, the group split up for solo careers, until returning over six years later (with Bushwick Bill) with the reunion album The Foundation.  To date, the album has sold 1,675,000 copies in the U.S.

Track listing

Samples
Do Yo Time
"Handclapping" Song by The Meters
Eye 4 an Eye
"Nadia's Theme (The Young and the Restless)" by Barry De Vorzon and Perry Botkin, Jr.
Gangsta (Put Me Down)
"Look-Alike" by Bob James
"Pass the Dutchie" by Musical Youth
Thugg Niggaz
"The Bed's Too Big Without You" by The Police

Charts

Weekly charts

Year-end charts

Personnel 
Mike Dean – producer, engineer, mastering, mixing
DMG – performer
Ghetto Twiinz – performer
Hurt 'Em Bad – producer
Anzel "Red Boy" Jennings – production co-ordination
Mr. Lee – producer, engineer, mixing
N.O. Joe – producer
Outlawz – performer
J. Prince – executive producer
Scarface – producer
Swift – producer
Tone Capone – producer
Yukmouth – performer
Jay Sinnusta - producer

References

1998 albums
Geto Boys albums
Rap-A-Lot Records albums
Albums produced by Mike Dean (record producer)